The following is a list of the television networks and announcers that have broadcast the ArenaBowl over the years.

2010s

Source:

Notes
The Arena Football League took a one-year hiatus in 2009, but returned in time for the 2010 season with a reformed business model.
The AFL signed a one-year deal with the NFL Network in 2010 and carried a weekly Friday night game throughout the entire 2010 season, as well as ArenaBowl XXIII. The contract between the AFL and NFL Network was renewed for another season in Fall 2010.
For the 2013 season, the league's new national broadcast partner was the CBS Sports Network. CBSSN aired nineteen regular season games and two playoff games. CBS aired the ArenaBowl (under the CBS Sports Spectacular umbrella), marking the first time since 2008 that the league's finale aired on broadcast network television.
In December 2013, it was announced that ESPN had acquired the rights to broadcast Arena football games, including ArenaBowl XXVI. This was the first ArenaBowl to be televised on ESPN since , prior to the year-long hiatus taken by the AFL.

2000s

Notes
ABC's ArenaBowl coverage from 2007 onward, were produced entirely by their corporate sibling (under the Walt Disney Company umbrella) ESPN.

1990s

Notes
ABC's ArenaBowl telecasts from 1998 to 2002 were aired as under the Wide World of Sports anthology umbrella.  Prior to this taste of widespread, national exposure, the most exposure that the league would receive was on ESPN, which would air tape-delayed games, often well after midnight.

1980s

See also
 Arena Football League#Television

References

External links
ArenaBowl.com

ArenaBowl numbers game.

Broadcasters
 
ABC Sports
Football on NBC
Arena Bowl
Prime Sports
Lists of announcers of American sports events
Wide World of Sports (American TV series)
Arena Bowl broadcasters
NFL Network
CBS Sports Spectacular